The Anneslie Historic District encompasses a residential area just north of the city line of Baltimore, Maryland in Towson.  It is a grid of five streets extending eastward from York Avenue and south from Regester Avenue.  The area was platted out in 1922 and mostly built out by the 1950s.  Properties in the northern section of the district, on Regester Avenue, Murdock, Anneslie, and Dunkirk Roads, were built in the 1920s and 1930s, in Bungalow, Foursquare, and cottage styles, while the streets further south were built out primarily with Cape, Tudor, and Colonial style houses. The district takes its name from Anneslie estate, whose house still stands in the district.

The district was added to the National Register of Historic Places in 2012.

See also
National Register of Historic Places listings in Baltimore County, Maryland

References

External links
, including undated photo, at Maryland Historical Trust

Historic districts in Baltimore County, Maryland
National Register of Historic Places in Baltimore County, Maryland
Colonial Revival architecture in Maryland
Tudor Revival architecture in Maryland
Historic districts on the National Register of Historic Places in Maryland